The Rajshahi Kings are a franchise cricket team based in Rajshahi, Bangladesh, which plays in the Bangladesh Premier League (BPL). They are one of the seven teams that are competing in the 2016 Bangladesh Premier League. The team is being captained by Darren Sammy.

Player draft
The 2016 BPL draft was held on 30 September. Prior to the draft, the seven clubs signed 38 foreign players to contracts and each existing franchise was able to retain two home-grown players from the 2015 season. A total 301 players participated in the draft, including 133 local and 168 foreign players. 85 players were selected in the draft.

Player transfers
Prior to the 2016 draft, a number of high-profile players moved teams. These included transfers between competing teams and due to the suspension of the Sylhet Super Stars and the introduction of two new teams, Khulna Titans and Rajshahi Kings.

Standings

 The top four teams will qualify for playoffs
  advanced to the Qualifier
  advanced to the Eliminator

Current squad

CEO – Tahmid Azizul Haque
Head coach–
 Sarwar Imran

References 

Bangladesh Premier League